Ted Drewes is a family-owned frozen custard company in St. Louis, Missouri, United States. The business was founded by Ted Drewes, Sr. in 1929. The shop on Chippewa Street (designated as a section of historic U.S. Route 66) is open much of the year, while the South Grand Boulevard location is open from mid-May through late August.

Its signature dish is the "concrete," a serving of frozen custard so thick that it is customarily presented to the customer upside down.

History
Ted Drewes started making frozen custard while working for a carnival and opened his first fixed location near St. Petersburg, Florida, in 1929. The first St. Louis shop began serving in 1930 on Natural Bridge Avenue near Goodfellow Blvd. Less than a year later, it was moved westward along the avenue. A second location was opened at 4224 South Grand Blvd. in 1931. In 1941, a third location opened at 6726 Chippewa Street, on one of the alignments of U.S. Route 66 through St. Louis. The Natural Bridge and Florida locations had closed by 1958, but the Chippewa and South Grand locations remain open.

For decades, the Grand Avenue location was the flagship store, serving what was then a densely populated urban area in the neighborhood of Dutchtown and near the neighborhoods of Tower Grove South, Gravois Park, Bevo Mill, Holly Hills, and Carondelet. Each year, it would open in April and close on October 31. The Chippewa location served as an outpost near the city limits for travelers heading to or returning from an Ozark weekend getaway. In those days, it was open from Memorial Day to Labor Day.

Between the population shifting west in the city and Route 66 drawing more crowds, the Chippewa store became the flagship location. Its season extended to more of the year, while the shop on Grand shortened its seasonal operation. In the wake of the transition, the Chippewa Street store expanded its building and bought a neighboring property to accommodate parking. As dessert eating habits have changed, the Chippewa store has stayed open later in the year. It is now closed for the winter only during the month of January. In 2013, it closed briefly after a minor electrical fire. The South Grand location now opens only for the summer months.

In the weeks leading up to Christmas, Ted Drewes sells live Christmas trees.

Ted Drewes, Jr., reports that he has fielded numerous requests to turn the small chain into a nationwide franchise, but has refused.

In 2019, Ted Drewes celebrated 90 years of serving frozen custard.

In the press
In 2006, the Route 66 location was featured on the Food Network show Feasting on Asphalt, hosted by Alton Brown.

In 2010, it was recommended by Bobby Flay on the "Sweet Tooth" episode of The Best Thing I Ever Ate.

In 2011, it was featured in a special "Route 66" episode of Man v. Food Nation, hosted by Adam Richman.

In 2014, it was awarded the "Riverfront Times" 2014 award for "Best Frozen Custard in St. Louis."

In 2017, it was awarded 'Best ice cream shop in the world’ by Soolnua, a branding and marketing firm in Dublin, Ireland, that publishes its world ice cream index every year.

See also
 List of frozen custard companies

Notes

External links

 

Restaurants in St. Louis
Buildings and structures on U.S. Route 66
Restaurants established in 1930
Frozen custard
Ice cream parlors in the United States
U.S. Route 66 in Missouri
Tourist attractions in St. Louis